Alejandro Nicolás Martínez Ramos (born 15 February 1989 in Ñemby), is a Paraguayan footballer who plays as a forward for Sportivo Trinidense in the Paraguayan División Intermedia. In 2008, he was considered one of the best young talents in Paraguayan football due to his excellent ball control, pace and technique.

Career

Club career
Martínez started his career in the youth divisions of Olimpia. After playing two games for the reserve squad, he was invited to join the first team squad by coach Gustavo Costas during the 2008 Apertura tournament. He soon became a regular player in the Olimpia team, before being sold to Mexican top-tier side Puebla in 2009. In 2011, after just 2 appearances with Puebla, Martínez was sold again, this time to Brazilian fourth-division side Juventude. For the 2012 Closin' tournament is repatriated by the Tacuary, where he became one of the scorers.

In 2013, he was signed by the Ecuadorian side C.S.D. Independiente del Valle.

In 2021, Martinez joined Sportivo Trinidense for the División Intermedia season.

References

External links
 Nicolás Martínez at BDFA.com.ar 
 

1989 births
Living people
People from Ñemby
Paraguayan footballers
Paraguay under-20 international footballers
Paraguayan Primera División players
Liga MX players
Categoría Primera A players
Campeonato Brasileiro Série D players
Ecuadorian Serie A players
Primera Nacional players
Argentine Primera División players
Peruvian Primera División players
Liga Nacional de Fútbol de Guatemala players
Club Olimpia footballers
Club Puebla players
C.S.D. Independiente del Valle footballers
Club Nacional footballers
Club Tacuary footballers
Crucero del Norte footballers
Esporte Clube Juventude players
Club Rubio Ñu footballers
Sportivo Luqueño players
Club Almagro players
Sportivo Trinidense footballers
Club Sol de América footballers
Independiente F.B.C. footballers
Deportes Quindío footballers
Ayacucho FC footballers
C.S.D. Municipal players
Paraguayan expatriate footballers
Paraguayan expatriate sportspeople in Argentina
Paraguayan expatriate sportspeople in Mexico
Paraguayan expatriate sportspeople in Brazil
Paraguayan expatriate sportspeople in Ecuador
Paraguayan expatriate sportspeople in Peru
Expatriate footballers in Argentina
Expatriate footballers in Mexico
Expatriate footballers in Brazil
Expatriate footballers in Ecuador
Expatriate footballers in Peru
Expatriate footballers in Guatemala
Association football forwards